Catherine Waldby  (born 18 September 1957) is an Australian academic, researcher and author. She is the Director of the Research School of Social Sciences at the Australian National University and a visiting professor at King's College London.

Waldby's research has been focused on social studies of biomedicine and the life sciences. She has written over 50 research articles and seven monographs. Her books include AIDS and the Body Politic: Biomedicine and Sexual Difference (1996), Tissue Economies: Blood, Organs and Cell Lines in Late Capitalism (2006) and Clinical Labor: Tissue donors and Research Subjects in the Bioeconomy (2014). In 2019, she wrote The Oöcyte Economy: The Changing Meanings of Human Eggs.

Waldby is the co-editor of BioSocieties, with Nikolas Rose and Hannah Landecker. In 2010, she was elected as a Fellow of the Academy of Social Sciences in Australia and in 2018, a member of the College of Experts, European Science Foundation. Her research has been funded by many international and national grants from various organizations including the Australian Research Council, the National Health and Medical Research Council and the UK Economic and Social Council.

Education 
Waldby received her secondary education at St Rita's College, Clayfield. After completing her BA in English Literature and Sociology from University of Queensland in 1982, she completed her MA in Government from Sydney University in 1983. In 1995, she received her Ph.D. in Social Sciences from Murdoch University.

Career 
After completing her Ph.D., Waldby joined the School of Media, Culture and Communication at Murdoch University as a Lecturer. During this time, she published her first book AIDS and the Body Politic: Biomedicine and Sexual Difference, which was widely accepted and positively reviewed. The work on her book led to her taking the position of Deputy Director and Senior Research Fellow of the National Center in HIV Social Research at the University of New South Wales in 1999.

In 2001, Waldby moved to the United Kingdom and joined Brunel University as the Director of Center for Research in Innovation, Culture and Technology. Waldby moved back to Australia in 2004 becoming a senior lecturer at University of New South Wales, while teaching as a visiting professor at Brunel University. In 2006, she left Brunel University and University of New South Wales and became Professor and Professorial Future Fellow at University of Sydney. While at University of Sydney, she started teaching at King's College, London as a Visiting Professor.

Waldby was appointed as the Director of the Research School of Social Sciences at Australian National University in 2015. From 2008 to 2010, she served on the executive board of the Society for Social Studies of Science.

Research and writing 
Waldby has made a significant contribution to the discipline of Sociology, in particular to the sociology of biomedicine. Her major contribution to this area is her work on the issues of value, ethics and governance that emerge from biomedical management of the body, particularly the management of human tissues. Her studies have analysed the social economy of human tissues, and the ethical and biopolitical tensions between their status as fragments of particular human bodies and their economic and therapeutic utility. Over the course of her career, she has developed a widely recognized "tissue economy" approach to the analysis of these developments.

AIDS and the Body Politic 
Waldby's first book AIDS and the Body Politic: Biomedicine and Sexual Difference was published in 1996. The book discusses how many of the ideas about HIV and the epidemiology of the disease come from unexamined assumptions about sexual identity. The book was received well. Writing for Review Symposia, G.W. Dowsett wrote that "AIDS and the Body Politic: Biomedicine and Sexual Difference represents a significant attempt to build a bridge between science and culture, and to indicate that the chasm between cultural, political and social understandings of the pandemic, and the biomedical understanding of the event of an HIV infection and its syndromic consequence AIDS, is not as wide as one would think." Fran Collyer reviewed the book in Journal of Sociology and called it "highly informative."

Tissue Economies
Tissue Economies: Blood, Organs and Cell Lines in Late Capitalism, Waldby's third book, co-authored with Robert Mitchell, was published in 2006. In it, she mapped the transformations of human tissue management (blood, organs, cell lines, embryos) from the post-war welfare state, with its emphasis on distributive justice, gift relations and citizenship, to a competition state and commercialized life science industry, with an emphasis on globalisation and the centrality of markets in the creation of value.

In this transformation, human tissues themselves are recalibrated as both intellectual property and forms of commercial productivity, opening up complex questions about property relations and the location of donor populations in the circuits of value creation. This transformation is conventionally presented as a shift from a gift economy for human tissues to a commodity economy. However, she demonstrated that this dichotomy, which structures the majority of bioethical and policy debate, is quite inadequate to understanding the centrality of speculative and promissory forms of value such as patenting of living material in contemporary tissue economies. She demonstrated that, under these historical conditions, the informed consent process, the primary regulatory technology governing the transfer of tissue from donor to recipient, took on some functions of a property contract, by securing the active consent of the donor to relinquish any claims to the future commercial value of their surrendered tissue. Informed consent in this sense becomes a crucial step in securing the conditions for the establishment of the recipient’s intellectual property claims, and hence right of deployment over future value creation.

The book received positive reviews and became Waldby's most cited work. Writing a positive review, Steve Chasin called the book "a valuable contribution to understanding the landscape of today's rapidly developing biotechnology industry." Ruth McManus called the book "revelatory". Writing in Science & Society, Kathryn Russell wrote that "there are compelling case studies, a wealth of information about biotechnology and its social context and a captivating critique of the ability of capitalist social relations to generate fantasies of bodily regeneration at the expense of the poor.

Clinical Labor 
To sharpen the gender analysis around tissue economies, Waldby developed two new analytic frameworks. One of these is elaborated in her book, Clinical Labor: Tissue donors and Research Subjects in the Global Bioeconomy, co-authored with Melinda Cooper, in which she developed a completely novel "precarity" approach to these issues that links them to broader concerns around labor rights and protections.

In the book, she argued that the increasingly transactional recruitment of tissue donors and clinical research subjects in the commercial biomedical research sectors and the pharmaceutical industry closely resembles other kinds of low-level service labor in the contemporary economy, yet they are not recognised as labor, either within the industrial sector or by regulatory systems. It links women’s labor in the bioeconomy to earlier debates about domestic labor, and to current debates about contractualisation, outsourcing and human capital theory.

In a review of the book in International Journal of Feminist Approaches to Bioethics, Emma Ryman wrote that "Providing historical context together with insightful analysis of the rise of clinical labor, Cooper and Waldby give readers a wide ranging, critical look at the role of this hidden workforce within the contemporary bioeconomy." Samuel Walker and Adam Mahoney wrote that "this is an important book for anyone interested in biopolitics and political economy, and Cooper and Waldby’s clinical labor theory of value provides a creative understanding of the post-Fordist regime of labor.

The Oöcyte Economy 
She developed the second framework in her book, The Oocyte Economy: The Changing Meaning of Human Eggs in Fertility, Assisted Reproduction and Stem Cell Research. In this framework, she has focused on gender, consumption and reproductive tissues, considering the ways that women increasingly resort to reproductive medical services, particularly oocyte and embryo banking and fertility tourism to manage key aspects of their life course, including credentialing and family formation, kinship relations, and fertility and aging. This work draws in particular on Raymond Williams’ proposals around ‘the structure of feeling’, as a way to account for the deeply felt, historically complex way women value and reason about their oocytes.

Awards and honors 
2010 – Fellow of the Academy of the Social Sciences in Australia
2016 – Member of the History and Philosophy of Science Committee, Australian Academy of Science
2018 – Member of the College of Experts, European Sciences Foundation

Selected publications

Books 
AIDS and the Body Politic: Biomedicine and Sexual Difference (1996)  
The Visible Human Project: Informatic Bodies and Posthuman Medicine (2000) 
Tissue Economies: Blood, Organs and Cell Lines in Late Capitalism (2006)  
The Global Politics of Human Embryonic Stem Cell Science: Regenerative Medicine in Transition (2009) 
Clinical Labor: Tissue donors and Research Subjects in the Bioeconomy (2014) 
Biolavoro globale: Corpi e nuove forme di manodopera. (2015) 
Sie nennen es Leben, wir nennen es Arbeit. Biotechnologie, Reproduktion und Familie im 21. Jahrhundert (2015) 
The Oöcyte Economy: The Changing Meanings of Human Eggs (2019)

Papers 
Catherine Waldby (2015) “‘Banking Time’: Egg Freezing, Internet Dating and the Negotiation of Future Fertility” Culture, Health & Sexuality, 17:4, 470–482, Special Issue ‘Sex, health and the technological imagination’ eds Mark Davis and Mary Lou Rasmussen. 
Waldby, Catherine and Carroll, Katherine (2012) ‘Egg donation for stem cell research: ideas of surplus and deficit in Australian IVF patients’ and reproductive donors’ accounts’ Sociology of Health and Illness vol. 34 (4): pp. 513–528
Robert Mitchell and Catherine Waldby (2010) ‘National Biobanks: Clinical Labour, Risk Production and the Creation of Biovalue’ Science, Technology and Human Values vol. 35. 3: 330 – 355.
Waldby, Catherine and Cooper, Melinda (2010) ‘From Reproductive Work to Regenerative Labour: The Female Body and the Stem Cell Industries’ Feminist Theory, 11 (1): 3–22 
Waldby, Catherine (2009) ‘Singapore Biopolis: Bare Life in the City State’ East Asian STS Journal vol: 3, nos. 2 & 3: 367–383, special issue, Science and Technology in Modern Southeast Asia” editor Warwick Anderson. 
Waldby, Catherine & Cooper, Melinda (2008) ‘The Biopolitics of Reproduction: Post-Fordist Biotechnology and Women’s Clinical Labour’ in Australian Feminist Studies vol. 23:55, 57 – 73 special issue The Two Cultures.
Waldby, Catherine (2006) ‘Umbilical Cord Blood: from Social Gift to Venture Capital’ BioSocieties vol. 1. no. 1: 55–70.
Waldby, C. Rosengarten, M. Treloar, C. & Fraser, S. (2004) ‘Blood and Bioidentity: Ideas about Self, Boundaries and Risk among Blood Donors and people living with Hepatitis C’, Social Science and Medicine Vol 59/7: 1461–1471. 
Waldby, Catherine (2002) 'Biomedicine, Tissue Transfer and Intercorporeality' Feminist Theory, Vol. 3 (3): 235–250 
Waldby, Catherine (2002) ‘Stem Cells, Tissue Cultures and the Production of Biovalue’ Health: an Interdisciplinary Journal for the Social Study of Health, Illness and Medicine Vol. 6. No. 3: 305–323.

References 

1957 births
Living people
Academic staff of the Australian National University
Academics of King's College London
Australian sociologists
Australian women sociologists
Fellows of the Academy of the Social Sciences in Australia